Garfield Township is one of sixteen townships in Hancock County, Iowa, USA.  As of the 2000 census, its population was 421.

History
Garfield Township was organized in 1880. It was named for President James A. Garfield.

Geography
According to the United States Census Bureau, Garfield Township covers an area of 35.44 square miles (91.8 square kilometers); of this, 35.02 square miles (90.7 square kilometers, 98.8 percent) is land and 0.42 square miles (1.1 square kilometers, 1.2 percent) is water.

Unincorporated towns
 Duncan at 
(This list is based on USGS data and may include former settlements.)

Adjacent townships
 Madison Township (north)
 Ellington Township (northeast)
 Concord Township (east)
 Ell Township (southeast)
 Liberty Township (south)
 Erin Township (southwest)
 Britt Township (west)
 Crystal Township (northwest)

Cemeteries
The township contains these two cemeteries: Saint Boniface and Saint John.

Major highways
  U.S. Route 18
  U.S. Route 69

Airports and landing strips
 Garner Municipal Airport [defunct]

Lakes
 Eagle Lake

School districts
 Garner-Hayfield-Ventura Community School District
 West Hancock Community School District

Political districts
 Iowa's 4th congressional district
 State House District 11
 State Senate District 6

References
 United States Census Bureau 2008 TIGER/Line Shapefiles
 United States Board on Geographic Names (GNIS)
 United States National Atlas

External links
 US-Counties.com
 City-Data.com

Townships in Hancock County, Iowa
Townships in Iowa